Ruellia formosa is a plant native to the Cerrado vegetation of Brazil, which is usually used like an ornamental plant, and it is pollinated by hummingbirds. Large scarlet-red blooms on & off from spring until first frost.  Can take full sun with adequate moisture like in a tropical location but best in shade.  Generally deer-resistant.

References
La Rue, Carl D. Intumescences on Poplar Leaves. I. Structure and Development [American Journal of Botany], Vol. 20, No. 1 (Jan., 1933), pp. 1–17

External links
   Missouri Botanical Garden: illustration of Ruellia formosa 
 SysTax: Ruellia formosa

formosa
Flora of Brazil
Plants described in 1813